Asphodelus bento-rainhae is a species of asphodel, endemic to the Iberian Peninsula.

Taxonomy
Two subspecies are recognised:
Asphodelus bento-rainhae subsp. bento-rainhae, endemic to the Gardunha range, Portugal.
Asphodelus bento-rainhae subsp. salmanticus Z.Díaz & Valdés, from western central Spain.

References

Asphodeloideae
Flora of Portugal
Flora of Spain